Port Waikato is a New Zealand parliamentary electorate which existed for four parliamentary terms from 1996 to 2008, and was recreated by the 2019/20 electoral redistribution ahead of the 2020 election. It was held by Bill Birch for one term, and by Paul Hutchison for the following three terms; both were members of the National Party.

Population centres
The  was notable for the significant change of electorate boundaries, based on the provisions of the Electoral Act 1993. Because of the introduction of the mixed-member proportional (MMP) electoral system, the number of electorates had to be reduced, leading to significant changes. More than half of the electorates contested in 1996 were newly constituted, and most of the remainder had seen significant boundary changes. In total, 73 electorates were abolished, 29 electorates were newly created (including Port Waikato), and 10 electorates were recreated, giving a net loss of 34 electorates.

In its initial area, towns with more than one polling booth were Huntly, Pukekohe, Ngāruawāhia, Tuakau, and Waiuku. Localities with a single polling booth were Aka Aka, Awhitu, Bombay, Buckland, Glen Massey, Glen Murray, Glenbrook, Horotiu, Mauku, Meremere, Naike, Ohinewai, Onewhero, Orini, Otaua, Paerata, Pōkeno, Port Waikato, Pukekawa, Pukemiro, Pukeoware, Puni, Raglan, Rangiriri, Ruawaro, Taupiri, Te Akau, Te Hoe, Te Kauwhata, Te Kohanga, Te Kowhai, Te Pahu, Te Uku, Waerenga, Waikaretu, Waikokowai, Waingaro, Waipipi, Waiterimu, Waitetuna, Whatawhata, and Whitikahu.

History
Bill Birch was the first representative of the Port Waikato electorate following the 1996 election.

In the 2019/2020 boundary review, the Representation Commission recreated it. This was necessitated by significant population growth in South Auckland and the Waikato region. Of the nine creations at that redistribution, it was one of the four included in the initial proposals.

Members of Parliament
Key

List MPs
Members of Parliament elected from party lists in elections where that person also unsuccessfully contested the Port Waikato electorate. Unless otherwise stated, all MPs terms began and ended at general elections.

Key

1Wall was elected from the party list in March 2008 following the resignation of Ann Hartley.

Election results

2020 election

1999 election
Refer to Candidates in the New Zealand general election 1999 by electorate#Port Waikato for a list of candidates.

1996 election

References

Historical electorates of New Zealand
1996 establishments in New Zealand
2008 disestablishments in New Zealand